5,10-Methylenetetrahydrofolate (N5,N10-Methylenetetrahydrofolate; 5,10-CH2-THF) is cofactor in several biochemical reactions.  It exists in nature as the diastereoisomer [6R]-5,10-methylene-THF.

As an intermediate in one-carbon metabolism, 5,10-CH2-THF interconverts to 5-methyltetrahydrofolate, 5-formyltetrahydrofolate, and methenyltetrahydrofolate.  It is substrate for the enzyme methylenetetrahydrofolate reductase (MTHFR) It is mainly produced by the reaction of tetrahydrofolate with serine, catalyzed by the enzyme serine hydroxymethyltransferase.

Selected functions

Formaldehyde detoxification
Methylenetetrahydrofolate is an intermediate in the detoxification of formaldehyde.

Pyrimidine biosynthesis
It is the one-carbon donor for thymidylate synthase, for methylation of 2-deoxy-uridine-5-monophosphate (dUMP) to 2-deoxy-thymidine-5-monophosphate (dTMP). The coenzyme is necessary for the biosynthesis of thymidine and is the C1-donor in the reactions catalyzed by TS and thymidylate synthase (FAD).

Biomodulator
[6R]-5,10-methylene-THF is a biomodulator that has proven to enhance the desired cytotoxic antitumor effect of Fluorouracil (5-FU) and can bypass the metabolic pathway required by other folates (such as leucovorin) to achieve necessary activation. The active metabolite is being evaluated in clinical trials for patients with colorectal cancer in combination with 5-FU.

See also
 5,10-Methenyltetrahydrofolate

References

Folates
Coenzymes